In engineering, shear strength is the strength of a material or component against the type of yield or structural failure when the material or component fails in shear. A shear load is a force that tends to produce a sliding failure on a material along a plane that is parallel to the direction of the force. When a paper is cut with scissors, the paper fails in shear.

In structural and  mechanical engineering, the shear strength of a component is important for designing the dimensions and materials to be used for the manufacture or construction of the component (e.g. beams, plates, or bolts). In a reinforced concrete beam, the main purpose of reinforcing bar (rebar) stirrups is to increase the shear strength.

Equations 

For shear stress  applies

where
 is major principal stress and
 is minor principal stress.

In general: ductile materials (e.g. aluminum) fail in shear, whereas brittle materials (e.g. cast iron) fail in tension. See tensile strength.

To calculate:

Given total force at failure (F) and the force-resisting area (e.g. the cross-section of a bolt loaded in shear), ultimate shear strength is:

For average shear stress

where

  is the average shear stress,
  is the shear force applied to each section of the part, and
  is the area of the section.

 

This is only the average stress, actual stress distribution is not uniform. In real world applications, this equation only gives an approximation and the maximum shear stress would be higher. Stress is not often equally distributed across a part so the shear strength would need to be higher to account for the estimate.

Comparison
As a very rough guide relating tensile, yield, and shear strengths:

USS: Ultimate Shear Strength, UTS: Ultimate Tensile Strength, SYS: Shear Yield Stress, TYS: Tensile Yield Stress

There are no published standard values for shear strength like with tensile and yield strength. Instead, it is common for it to be estimated as 60% of the ultimate tensile strength. Shear strength can be measured by a torsion test where it is equal to their torsional strength.

When values measured from physical samples are desired, a number of testing standards are available, covering different material categories and testing conditions. In the US, ASTM standards for measuring shear strength include ASTM B769, B831, D732, D4255, D5379, and D7078. Internationally, ISO testing standards for shear strength include ISO 3597, 12579, and 14130.

See also
 Shear modulus
 Shear stress
 Shear strain
 Shear strength (soil)
 Shear strength (Discontinuity)
 Strength of materials
 Tensile strength

References

Mechanical engineering
Structural engineering